Fukang may refer to:

 Fukang, a county-level city in Xinjiang Uygur Autonomous Region of the People's Republic of China
 Fukang Subdistrict, a subdistrict and the seat of Qiaodong District, in the heart of Shijiazhuang, Hebei, People's Republic of China
 Fukang (meteorite), a meteorite that was found in the mountains near Fukang, China in 2000
 Citroën Fukang, the first in a range of cars produced for the Chinese market by the Dongfeng Peugeot-Citroën Automobile
 Fukang (automotive brand), an automotive brand
 Princess Fukang, a princess of the Song Dynasty